George Ashwell may refer to:

George Gilbert Ashwell (1916–2014), American biochemist
George Ashwell (controversialist) (1612–1695), Anglo-Catholic controversialist